Paul Stephen Wright  (born 26 December 1966) is a British Anglican priest and chaplain. Since 2015, he has served as Sub-Dean of the Chapel Royal and Deputy Clerk of the Closet: as such, he is the only full-time clerical member of the Royal Household of the United Kingdom. Prior to his royal service, he was ordained in the Church of England and served in the Royal Army Chaplains' Department. His last post before leaving the military was as Chaplain of the Royal Military Academy, Sandhurst.

Early life and education
Wright was born on 26 December 1966 in Winstanley, Wigan, Lancashire, England. He studied at Lancashire Polytechnic, graduating with a Bachelor of Arts (BA) degree in 1988. From 1990 to 1993, he trained for Holy Orders at Westcott House, Cambridge, a Liberal Anglican theological college. He undertook further studies at the University of Liverpool, completing a Master of Arts (MA) degree in 1996, and at Cardiff University, completing a Master of Theology (MTh) degree in 2011.

Career

Early ministry
Wright was ordained in the Church of England as a deacon in 1993 and as a priest in 1994. From 1993 to 1996, he served his curacy at Church of St Thomas the Martyr, Upholland in the Diocese of Liverpool.

Military service
He was commissioned into the Royal Army Chaplains Department in 1994. He has served with the Royal Artillery, the Army Foundation College, the Queen's Lancashire Regiment, the Queen's Dragoon Guards, the 2nd Infantry Brigade. In 2003 he served in Iraq and at Supreme Headquarters Allied Powers in Europe in Belgium, while in 2005 he served in Bosnia and Kosovo as Senior Chaplain of the European Union Force.

In 2010, Wright was posted as Senior Chaplain of the Allied Rapid Reaction Corps in Gloucester and the International Security Assistance Force Joint Command in Kabul. He was appointed as the Chaplain of the Royal Military Academy in 2012. He retired from the army on 1 January 2015.

Royal service
In January 2015, Wright was installed as Sub-Dean of the Chapel Royal during a service at the Chapel Royal of St James's Palace, in succession to Bill Scott. As Sub-Dean, he is also Deputy Clerk of the Closet, Sub-Almoner, and Domestic Chaplain to the late Queen, Elizabeth II and now her son, Charles III.  The Deputy Clerk is the only full-time clerical member of the Ecclesiastical Household.

Wright was appointed Lieutenant of the Royal Victorian Order (LVO) in the 2023 New Year Honours.

Writings
In 2009, Wright wrote Funny Little Wars: Games of War in the Garden With Classic Toy Soldiers In The Spirit of Mr. H G Wells. In 2022 a revised edition was published, which added new content to complement the existing rules.

Personal life
In 2006, Wright married Georgina Elisabeth Peek. She is a trained singer. Together they have four children: two sons and two daughters.

References 

 

 
 
 

Living people
20th-century English Anglican priests
English military chaplains
Deputy Clerks of the Closet
Alumni of Westcott House, Cambridge
Alumni of the University of Liverpool
Alumni of the University of Central Lancashire
Alumni of Cardiff University
1966 births
Royal Army Chaplains' Department officers
21st-century English Anglican priests
People from Wigan
Lieutenants of the Royal Victorian Order